On 22 November 2003, shortly after takeoff from Baghdad, Iraq, an Airbus A300B2-200F cargo plane, registered OO-DLL and owned by European Air Transport (doing business as DHL Express), was struck on the left wing by a surface-to-air missile while on a scheduled flight to Muharraq, Bahrain. Severe wing damage resulted in a fire and complete loss of hydraulic flight control systems. Because outboard left wing fuel tank 1A was full at takeoff, no fuel-air vapour explosion occurred. Liquid jet fuel dropped away as 1A disintegrated. Inboard fuel tank 1 was pierced and leaking.

Returning to Baghdad, the three-man crew made an injury-free landing of the seriously damaged A300, using differential engine thrust as the only pilot input. This was despite major damage to a wing, total loss of hydraulic control, a faster-than-safe landing speed, and a ground path that veered off the runway surface and onto unprepared ground.

Paris Match reporter Claudine Vernier-Palliez accompanied a Fedayeen unit on their strike mission against the DHL aircraft.

Sara Daniel, a French weekly newsmagazine journalist, claimed receipt, from an unknown source, of a video that showed Iraqi insurgents (belonging to IAI), faces concealed, firing a missile at the DHL A300. Daniel was researching a feature about Iraqi resistance groups, but she denied any specific knowledge of the people who carried out the attack, despite being present at the moment of attack.

Aircraft

The aircraft involved was an Airbus A300B4-203F. It first flew with Malaysia Airlines as a passenger aircraft registered 9M-MHB on 28 December, 1979 before having a stint with Carnival Air Lines registered N225KW on 30 June, 1995. The plane was converted into cargo configuration on 12 March, 1999, and was delivered to European Air Transport on 22 September, 2000.

Background
The aircraft took off from Baghdad International Airport en route to Bahrain International Airport at 06:30 UTC with an experienced crew of three - two Belgians, 38-year-old Captain Éric Gennotte and 29-year-old First Officer Steeve Michielsen, and a Scotsman, 54-year-old flight engineer Mario Rofail. The captain had 3,300 total flight hours, more than half of them logged in the A300. The first officer had 1,275 hours of flight experience and the flight engineer had 13,400 hours of flight experience.

Moments following the strike

To reduce exposure to ground attack, the aircraft was executing a rapid climbout. Around  altitude, a 9K34 Strela-3 (SA-14 Gremlin) surface-to-air missile struck the rear of the left wing between the engine and the wing tip. The warhead damaged trailing-edge surfaces of the wing structure and caused a fire. All three hydraulic systems lost pressure, and flight controls were disabled. The aircraft pitched rapidly up and down in a roller-coaster phugoid, oscillating between a nose-up and a nose-down position.

As in the case of the 1989 United Airlines Flight 232 disaster in the United States, Captain Genotte could only use thrust to modify pitch, speed, and altitude and vary throttles asymmetrically to control yaw and turn the aircraft. Flight engineer Mario Rofail executed a gravity drop to extend the landing gear, a procedure normally accomplished with hydraulic power. Early deployment of the gear was critical to a safe outcome because increased drag helped reduce speed and stabilize the aircraft.

In about 10 minutes of experimentation, the crew learned to manage turns, climbs, and descents. After a meandering trajectory, they executed a right turn and initiated a descent path to Baghdad International Airport.

Final approach and emergency landing

Because of left wing damage and fuel loss, Rofail had to monitor the engine closely; if fuel flow was lost from the left side, he would have to feed fuel from a right tank to maintain thrust. Survival was dependent on accurate power control of each jet engine.

Genotte and Michielsen set up for a final approach to runway 33R. The aircraft drifted to the right of the intended course, so Genotte chose the shorter 33L runway. Visibility was excellent and the pilots managed a controlled descent. They knew, counterintuitively, that they could not reduce the throttles before touchdown without risking the nose or a wing smashing into the ground.

With thrust adjustments, the roll was controlled, but the aircraft touched down off the runway centerline. Rofail immediately deployed full reverse thrust, but the aircraft veered off the paved runway.

Awards and aftermath

The Honourable Company of Air Pilots jointly honoured all three crewmembers with its Hugh Gordon-Burge Memorial Award. This is awarded to flight crew whose actions contributed outstandingly to saving their aircraft or passengers, or made a significant contribution to future air safety. The annual award is made only if a nomination is considered to be of significant merit.

The Flight Safety Foundation's FSF Professionalism Award in Flight Safety was presented to the crewmembers for their "extraordinary piloting skills in flying their aircraft to a safe landing after a missile strike following takeoff from Baghdad, Iraq".

In May 2006, Captain Éric Genotte, together with Armand Jacob, an Airbus experimental test pilot, gave a presentation to the Toulouse branch of the Royal Aeronautical Society titled "Landing an A300 Successfully Without Flight Controls".

In addition to severe wing and undercarriage damage, both jet engines suffered ruinous abuse by ingesting debris. In November 2004, the aircraft was repaired and re-registered as N1452, then put up for sale, but remained unsold. The N1452 registration expired in 2018. The aging aircraft did not fly again and has since been scrapped.

In popular culture
The incident was featured in "Attack over Baghdad", a season-three (2005) episode of the Canadian TV series Mayday (called Air Emergency and Air Disasters in the U.S. and Air Crash Investigation in the UK and elsewhere around the world).

See also

 Japan Airlines Flight 123
 United Airlines Flight 232
 Civil Aircraft Missile Protection System
 Flight Guard
 Flight with disabled controls
 List of airliner crashes involving loss of control

Further reading
 Aviation Week and Space Technology, 8 December 2003

References

External links
 
 Agence France-Presse article about the incident
 ParisMatch article by Claudine Vernier-Palliez, who accompanied the Fedayeen commando unit that attacked the plane.
 Paper by Jacques Rosay
 Australian Government Civil Aviation Safety Authority
 Australian Society of Air Safety Investigators

Baghdad DHL
Accidents and incidents involving the Airbus A300
Aviation accidents and incidents in Iraq
Baghdad DHL shootdown incident
Baghdad DHL shootdown incident
DHL
21st-century aircraft shootdown incidents
November 2003 events in Asia
2003 disasters in Iraq